Homem is a surname meaning "man" in Portuguese. Notable people with the surname include:

Diogo Homem (1521–1576), Portuguese cartographer
Guy-Manuel de Homem-Christo (born 1974), French musician, record producer, singer, songwriter, DJ, film director and composer
Lopo Homem ( 1497– 1572), Portuguese cartographer

Portuguese-language surnames